IVS is an abbreviation that can mean:
Incredible Value Services

Organizations
 Indus Valley School of Art and Architecture, Karachi, Pakistan
 International Vedanta Society, an Advaita Vedantic organization based in India
 International Voluntary Service, an international volunteering organisation based in the United Kingdom.
 International Voluntary Services, a private international volunteer organization
 NV Ingenieurskantoor voor Scheepsbouw, a dummy company set up after World War I in order to maintain and develop German               submarine know-how
 International Viola Society, an international organization dedicated to players of the viola

Biology and medicine
 Intervening sequence, a nucleotide sequence within a gene that is removed by RNA splicing while the final mature RNA product of a gene is being generated
 Interventricular septum, a part of the heart
 Intravaginal slingplasty

Other
 International Valuation Standards, technical and ethical standards for the conduct of valuations
 Indus Valley Script, short strings of symbols associated with the Indus Valley Civilization
 Ideographic Variation Selectors or Ideographic Variation Sequence, variation selector for, or variation sequence of, Ideographic characters in Unicode